Richard Wellington McLaren (April 21, 1918 – February 25, 1976) was a United States district judge of the United States District Court for the Northern District of Illinois.

Education and career

Born on April 21, 1918, in Chicago, Illinois, McLaren received a Bachelor of Arts degree from Yale University in 1939 and a Bachelor of Laws from Yale Law School in 1942, and thereafter briefly entered private practice in New York City, New York. He was in the United States Army Air Forces during World War II, serving from 1942 to 1946, where he attained the rank of captain. Afterwards, he returned to private practice in New York. In 1950, he moved back to Chicago. He became an Assistant Attorney General of the United States, supervising the Antitrust Division from 1969 until his appointment to the federal bench. As Assistant Attorney General, he argued for the Government in the United States Supreme Court in Blonder-Tongue Labs., Inc. v. University of Ill. Foundation and FTC v. Sperry & Hutchinson Co.

Federal judicial service

McLaren was nominated by President Richard Nixon on December 2, 1971, to a seat vacated by Judge Julius Hoffman on the United States District Court for the Northern District of Illinois. He was confirmed on December 2, 1971, and received his commission on January 26, 1972. He remained on the court until his death of the effects of an undisclosed debilitating illness on February 25, 1976, in Chicago.

References

Sources
 

1918 births
1976 deaths
Lawyers from Chicago
Military personnel from Illinois
Yale University alumni
Judges of the United States District Court for the Northern District of Illinois
United States district court judges appointed by Richard Nixon
United States Assistant Attorneys General for the Antitrust Division
20th-century American judges
United States Army Air Forces officers
United States Army Air Forces personnel of World War II